Hohenkrähen is a mountain in Baden-Württemberg, Germany.

Location and Surroundings 

Mountains and hills of Baden-Württemberg
Mountains and hills of the Hegau

This mountain lies between the places of Schlatt unter Krähen and Gemarkung.

Height 
The summit of Hohenkrähen is 644 meters (2,113 feet) above sea level. The mountain offers a good view of Hohentwiel, Mägdeberg and the western Lake Constance area.

Botanical 
There are different types of rare plants located on the mountain.  These include: Gray cinquefoil, Bleicher Wallflower (Erysimum crepidifolium), Mountain Alyssum, Festknolliger Corydalis , Finger Toothwort (Dentaria pentaphyllos), Yellow Sage ( Salvia glutinosa ) and mountain leek (Allium senescens).  The mountain is also fully covered in Tilia trees.